is a former Japanese football player.

Playing career
Uchibayashi was born in Konan on June 27, 1983. After graduating from high school, he joined J1 League club Gamba Osaka in 2002. However he could not play at all in the match. In 2004, he moved to J2 League club Ventforet Kofu. He debuted in June and played several matches in 2004 season. In 2005, he moved to Regional Leagues club Rosso Kumamoto. He played many matches and Rosso was promoted to Japan Football League (JFL) end of 2005 season. However he could not play at all in the match in 2006. In October 2006, he moved to Regional Leagues club MIO Biwako Kusatsu. He played many matches in 2007 and MIO Biwako was promoted to JFL end of 2007 season. He retired end of 2009 season.

Club statistics

References

External links

1983 births
Living people
Association football people from Shiga Prefecture
Japanese footballers
J1 League players
J2 League players
Japan Football League players
Gamba Osaka players
Ventforet Kofu players
Roasso Kumamoto players
MIO Biwako Shiga players
Association football midfielders